Elephant Center may refer to:

Api Elephant Domestication Center (closed), in the Belgian Congo
Elephant Training Center, Konni, in Kerala, India
The National Elephant Center (closed), in Fellsmere, Florida, U.S.
Center for Elephant Conservation, in Polk City, Florida, U.S.

See also
Project Elephant, a programme in India
Elephant Hall (disambiguation)